The Western Development Museum is a network of four museums in Saskatchewan, Canada preserving and recording the social and economic development of the province. The museum has branches in Moose Jaw, North Battleford, Saskatoon and Yorkton. Respectively, each branch focuses on a different theme: transportation, agriculture, economy, and people. The museum is affiliated with the Canadian Museums Association, the Canadian Heritage Information Network, and Virtual Museum of Canada.

History
Originally started as a grass-roots movement, the museum was founded with the passage of the Western Development Museum Act in 1949. The first home for the museum in 1949 was a refurbished hangar in North Battleford. Later the same year a similar structure in Saskatoon was converted into a second location for the museum. A third hangar was procured in Yorkton in 1951 and was likewise converted. In 1972, the first purpose-built buildings were constructed to house new locations for the museums in Yorkton and Saskatoon, followed by the addition of a new museum in Moose Jaw in 1976.

Moose Jaw – History of Transportation

The Moose Jaw location of the museum is dedicated to all facets of transportation.

This branch offers a specific focus on aviation, which is appropriate given its proximity to CFB Moose Jaw.  The aviation exhibits include a dedicated Snowbirds aerobatic team display. The aircraft collection includes an American Aerolights Eagle ultralight, an Avro Anson bomber trainer, Canadair CT-114 Tutor in Snowbirds markings, Canadair CT-133 Silver Star, Fairchild M63A3 Cornell, and a CT-133 Silver Star ejection seat.

The museum also has the Western Development Museum Short Line, a  narrow gauge railway outdoors on the property that utilizes the only operating steam locomotive in Saskatchewan.

North Battleford – Heritage Farm & Village

The North Battleford branch of the museum has displays relating to both farm and village aspects of pioneer life. The large barn is home to a number of farm animals. The museum demonstrates how farmers worked the land in the 1920s. The location has a pioneer village, which includes a grain elevator, a co-operative store, several churches, businesses, and homes.

The former Saskatchewan Wheat Pool grain elevator No. 889 is from Keatley, Saskatchewan and was moved to the museum grounds in 1983.

Saskatoon – 1910 Boomtown

The Saskatoon branch of the WDM was originally located on 11th Street on the city's west side, where it hosted an annual festival called "Pion-Era". The Saskatoon WDM relocated to its current site on the Prairieland Park grounds in the early 1970s.

For many years the Saskatoon branch was associated with the Saskatoon Exhibition and was instrumental in the fair being renamed "Pioneer Days", which incorporated Pion-Era. By the 1980s, the WDM and the Exhibition began to distance themselves from each other. By the 1990s the WDM was no longer a part of the exhibition, which in turn all but eliminated any remaining Pion-Era elements; Pioneer Days became "The Ex" and, later, simply "Saskatoon Exhibition".

The Saskatoon WDM is noted for its indoor recreation of a 1910s-era "boomtown". Actual buildings from the era, combined with recreations, are kept in a climate-controlled environment and filled with artifacts of the time (in contrast to the North Battleford WDM, which has its buildings outside). Buildings on site include a homestead, police station, bank, newspaper office (with working printing press), saddle shop, general store, and dentist's office. The museum also includes displays of vintage automobiles and farm equipment. The Saskatoon branch also has convention facilities and is home to the Saskatchewan Agricultural Hall of Fame.

In 2005, the Saskatoon WDM underwent major renovations to its exhibit halls in celebration of Saskatchewan's centennial.

Yorkton – Story of People
The Yorkton branch of the museum is focused on the immigrant experience. It includes scenes illustrating the cultural roots of many of the groups who settled in western Canada, such as Ukrainians, English, Swedes, Germans, Doukhobors and Icelanders.

Major artifacts
Partial list
 The Western Development Museum has the last remaining example of the Ferranti-Packard 6000, a Canadian designed early mainframe computer. It was donated by SaskPower.
 A replica of the Canadian Vickers Vedette is under construction by the Saskatchewan Western Development Museum. In 2003, the WDM acquired part of an original hull, which is displayed as an artifact in condition as found. With plans loaned from the Western Canada Aviation Museum, a group of volunteers from the Vintage Aircraft Restorers undertook the construction. In 2014, the VAR Vendette Project won a Ninety-Nines Canadian Award in Aviation.

Images

See also

 Saskatchewan Railway Museum

References

External links

 Saskatchewan Western Development Museum

Aviation history of Canada
Western Development Museum, Saskatchewan
Saskatchewan Western Development Museum
Aerospace museums in Saskatchewan
Western Development Museum, Saskatchewan
Transport museums in Saskatchewan
Agriculture museums in Canada
Open-air museums in Canada
Living museums in Canada
Museum organizations